A buyers club or buying club is a club organized to pool members' collective buying power, enabling them to make purchases at lower prices than are generally available, or to purchase goods that might be difficult to obtain independently.

Some key examples of buyers clubs include medical purchases of rare medications for treating HIV or hepatitis C sooner, at reduced cost for patients.

Community bulk purchases
In many parts of the United States, Canada, and Europe, families and individuals combine their purchasing power to buy items, typically bulk-type food, in a volume that generates a discounted price from the seller. The seller saves by having only one purchase order to manage and, possibly, less packaging and delivery to deal with. The buyers benefit from a lower per-unit cost and, incidentally, from an increased sense of community and sharing. Bulk-food sellers often provide tools so their customers can set up community buyers' clubs, for example:.

The trend for buyers' clubs, or local coops, accelerated starting in the 1970s. However, these groups are organic in structure, locally governed, and can come into being and go out of existence without much publicity, so there is no precise figure for how many buyers' clubs of this sort exist or have existed.

AIDS epidemic

In the early days of the HIV/AIDS epidemic, AIDS buyers clubs became important as a means of obtaining medications not yet approved by the FDA that members thought might be useful in treating HIV and opportunistic infections. The first and largest of these was the People With AIDS Health Group (PWA Health Group), founded in 1986 by Thomas Hannan, Joseph Sonnabend, and Michael Callen.  AIDS buyers clubs distributed such unapproved drugs as ribavirin, dextran sulfate, and DCNB (dinitrochlorobenzene), as well as cheaper pirated versions of zidovudine (AZT), which was the first antiretroviral drug that was FDA-approved for the treatment of HIV and AIDS in 1987.  AIDS buyers clubs also distributed information about the disease and drug developments, and became an important source of AIDS treatment education and advocacy. An example of an AIDS buyers club was drawn to wider prominence with the 2013 film release Dallas Buyers Club.

Hepatitis C

In response to the high price of modern direct-acting antiviral (DAA) treatments for hepatitis C, the FixHepC buyers club was set up by James Freeman and his father John Freeman  in Australia in 2015 in order to help individual patients obtain legal access to generic versions of sofosbuvir, daclatasvir, and ledipasvir.
At EASL International Liver Congress, Dr. Freeman presented data showing how generic versions are as effective as branded products.

Scams
In the United States, the Federal Trade Commission (FTC) found that fraudulent or misleading buyers clubs were one of the top three types of consumer fraud in 2011, affecting about 0.6% of the US population every year.

These memberships are typically sold in the course of selling another product, either with a free trial membership being a condition of making the purchase at the offered price or with a free trial membership being included as a "thank you" gift along with the initial purchase. The customer may not understand what was purchased or may believe that they have not authorized payment for the membership, and yet the credit card used for the initial purchase is billed for the buyer's club membership at the end of the free trial. According to Iowa Attorney General Tom Miller, "Consumers often tell us they don't recall ever having spoken to the companies, and they don't understand how they can be charged when they have not given the company their credit card number."

Sometimes, a wide variety of products are promised at a discount, and then once the fee is paid the products are unavailable or not as advertised. This is particularly true for travel-related buying clubs.

References

Further reading

Florida Buying Club Company Agrees to Refunds and Stop Marketing to Iowa Consumers, Iowa Attorney General, April 2015

Liz Reitzig of Grassfed on the Hill: Food Buying Clubs and Why They Matter October 20, 2017

Cooperatives